Homestead Township may refer to:

 Homestead Township, Chase County, Kansas
 Homestead Township, Michigan
 Homestead Township, Otter Tail County, Minnesota
 Homestead Township, Richland County, North Dakota, in Richland County, North Dakota

Township name disambiguation pages